Hvalur 7 RE-377 is an Icelandic whaling ship built in 1945 in England by Smith's Dock Company. It has been a part of the Icelandic whaling fleet operated and owned by the company Hvalur hf. since 1961. It was bought, along with its sister ship Hvalur 6, to replace the aging Hvalur 2 and Hvalur 3 which where built between 1920 and 1930. In 1965, the ship participated in the first Icelandic scientific expedition to tag whales.

The ship was previously named Southern Wilcox and operated by The South Georgia Company in Leith, Scotland from 1945 to 1961.

1986 sinking

In November 1986, Hvalur 7 along with Hvalur 6 where sunk in Reykjavík harbour by anti-whaling activists from the Sea Shepherd Conservation Society. Both ships were raised a few days later. While the steam engines where undamaged, the ships electrical wirings, interiors and various devices where damaged by the salt. While feasible, the ships have yet to be fully repaired and have never gone whaling after the sinking. They are now stored on dry land next to the company's whaling station in Hvalfjörður, north of Reykjavík, where they are securely anchored and connected to electricity and heating.

Notable captains
Friðbert Elí Gíslason

References

External links
Skipaskrá - The Icelandic ship registry
Profile on teesbuiltships.co.uk

1945 ships
Ships built in England
Whaling ships
Ships of Iceland
Whaling in Iceland